ENTSO-E, the European Network of Transmission System Operators, represents 39 electricity transmission system operators (TSOs) from 35 countries across Europe, thus extending beyond EU borders. ENTSO-E was established and given legal mandates by the EU's Third Package for the Internal energy market in 2009, which aims at further liberalising the gas and electricity markets in the EU.

History 
On 27 June 2008, 36 European electricity transmission system operators (TSOs) signed in Prague a declaration of intent to create the ENTSO-E. ENTSO-E was established on 19 December 2008 in Brussels by 42 TSOs as a successor of six regional associations of the electricity transmission system operators. ENTSO-E became operational on 1 July 2009. The former associations ETSO, ATSOI, UKTSOA, NORDEL, UCTE and BALTSO became a part of the ENTSO-E, while still offering data by their predecessors for public interest.

Creation of ENTSO-E was initiated by the adoption of the European Union third legislative package on the gas and electricity markets. In 2003, the European Commission conducted a sector inquiry concerning the competition of electricity market in six European countries. Examining competition in these countries, the final report stated serious issues to be solved. It was noticed that the integration between member state's markets is still insufficient. Additionally, the absence of transparently available market information was assessed. As a result, the third legislative package on the EU gas and electricity markets was adopted by the European Commission in September 2007.

Objectives 
According to its website, "ENTSO-E promotes closer cooperation across Europe’s TSOs to support the implementation of EU energy policy and achieve Europe’s energy & climate policy objectives, which are changing the very nature of the power system. The main objectives of ENTSO-E centre on the integration of renewable energy sources (RES) such as wind and solar power into the power system, and the completion of the internal energy market (IEM), which is central to meeting the European Union’s energy policy objectives of affordability, sustainability and security of supply. [...] ENTSO-E aims to be the focal point for all technical, market and policy issues relating to TSOs and the European network, interfacing with power system users, EU institutions, regulators and national governments."

Members 
TSOs are responsible for the bulk transmission of electric power on the main high voltage electric networks. TSOs provide grid access to the electricity market players (i.e., generating companies, traders, suppliers, distributors, and directly connected customers) according to non-discriminatory and transparent rules. In many countries, TSOs are in charge of the development of the grid infrastructure, too. TSOs in the European Union internal electricity market are entities operating independently from the other electricity market players (unbundling).

ENTSO-E contained 39 Member TSOs from 35 countries as of September 2022. Due to Brexit three Great Britain based operators left and only Northern Ireland's SONI remains from the UK. 

On 14 January 2016 TEİAŞ signed an agreement with ENTSO-E to become first observer member, the agreement expired in January 2019. On 26 April 2022 Ukrenergo signed Observer Membership Agreement with ENTSO-E. On 13 December 2022 TEİAŞ signed a new Observer Membership Agreement that will run for a period of three years.

Observers

Geographical area 

The geographical area covered by ENTSO-E's member TSOs is divided into five synchronous areas and two isolated systems (Cyprus and Iceland). Synchronous areas are groups of countries that are connected via their respective power systems. The system frequency (50 Hz, with usually very minor deviations) is synchronous within each area, and a disturbance at one single point in the area will be registered across the entire zone. Individual synchronous areas are interconnected through direct current interconnectors.

The benefits of synchronous areas include pooling of generation capacities, common provisioning of reserves, both resulting in cost-savings, and mutual assistance in the event of disturbances, resulting in cheaper reserve power costs (for instance in case of a disturbance or outage).

Legal basis 
The Third Energy Package and Regulation (EC) No 714/2009 on conditions for access to the network for cross-border exchanges in electricity regulation stipulate ENTSO-E's tasks and responsibilities. Regulation (EU) 838/2010 on guidelines relating to the inter-TSO compensation mechanism sets out the methodology by which TSOs receive compensation for the costs incurred in hosting cross-border flows of electricity. Regulation (EU) 347/2013 on guidelines for trans-European energy infrastructure defines European Projects of Common Interest (PCIs) identifies ENTSO-E's ten-year network development plan (TYNDP) as the basis for the selection of PCIs. ENTSO-E is also mandated to develop a corresponding cost–benefit methodology for the assessment of transmission infrastructure projects.

The Transparency Regulation (EU) No. 543/2013 on submission and publication of data in electricity markets makes it mandatory for European Member State data providers and owners to submit fundamental information related to electricity generation, load, transmission, balancing, outages, and congestion management for publication through the ENTSO-E Transparency Platform.

ENTSOE does not class as a "public sector body" under the meaning provided in the 2019 Open Data Directive.

Key activities

Pan-European Transmission Network plans and cost–benefit analysis 
The ten-year network development plan 2016 (TYNDP) is drafted by ENTSO-E, in close cooperation with stakeholders, under scrutiny of ACER and is finally adopted by the European Commission. It is the only existing pan-European network development plan. It is the basis for the selection of EU projects of common interest (PCIs). The list of PCIs is not fixed by ENTSO-E and is subject to a different process led by the European Commission and EU Member States.

The TYNDP is updated every two years. For inclusion in the TYNDP, each project, whether transmission or storage, has to go through a cost–benefit analysis. The benefit analysis methodology is developed by ENTSO-E in consultation with stakeholders and adopted by the European Commission. It assesses projects against socio-economic and environmental criteria.

Adequacy forecasts 
ENTSO-E publishes summer and winter generation outlooks, well as a long-term system adequacy forecast, the Scenario Outlook & Adequacy Forecast (SO&AF). The seasonal outlooks assess if there is enough generation to cover supply and highlight possibilities for neighbouring countries to contribute to the generation/demand balance in critical situations in a specific country. The SO&AF analyses system adequacy on the long-term and is connected to investment decisions.

Network codes 
ENTSO-E's network codes are binding pan-European rules drafted by ENTSO-E in consultation with stakeholders, with guidance from ACER. Network codes are grouped in three areas: 
 connection codes connecting electricity generators, demand, and direct current lines to the transmission grids; 
 operational codes governing how the pan-European electricity systems are operated; 
 and market codes facilitating and harmonising electricity trading across European borders.
The drafting and adoption process of network codes is defined by the Third Package. ACER develops a framework guideline setting the policy choices for each code. On this basis, the codes are drafted by ENTSO-E in consultation with stakeholders. After ACER's opinion and recommendation for adoption, each code is submitted to the European Commission for approval through the Comitology process, i.e., to be voted on by Member State representatives and thus to become EU law, directly binding and implemented across all Member States.

Transparency Platform (TP) 
ENTSO-E's Central Information Transparency Platform provides free access to fundamental data and information on pan-European wholesale energy generation, transmission, and consumption.

Research, development, and innovation (RDI) 
ENTSO-E's R&D Roadmap provides the ENTSO-E vision on grid projects to be carried out by TSOs to meet EU objectives. The roadmap is supported by the annual R&D Implementation Plan, which combines both top-down and bottom-up approaches in meeting the requirements of the roadmap. ENTSO-E publishes annually a R&D Monitoring Report that assesses the progress of TSO-related R&D work.

Governance 
ENTSO-E is an international non-profit association (AISBL) established according to Belgian law. ENTSO-E is financed by its members. The TSOs contribute to the budget according to the number of countries and the population served.

The highest body of ENTSO-E is the Assembly, which is composed of representatives at CEO level of all the currently 43 members. The ENTSO-E Board is elected every two years from the overall membership and through the Assembly. It includes 12 representatives. The president, vice president, and committee chairs are invited to board meetings. The board coordinates the committees and LRG work and implements Assembly decisions.

ENTSO-E has established four specialized committees composed of managers from member TSOs. Each committee leads a number of regional groups and working groups.

At the same level as the four committees, the transversal Legal & Regulatory Group advises all ENTSO-E bodies on legal and regulatory issues. In addition, expert groups on data, network codes implementation, and EU affairs provide specific expertise and work products to the association.

ENTSO-E's Secretariat is based in Brussels. It is headed by the secretary-general and represents ENTSO-E to the European institutions, regulators, and stakeholders.

Organizational chart

Key figures (2022) 
 39 transmission system operators 
 35 European countries
 532 million customers served 
  of transmission lines  
 3,174.2 TWh electricity transported 
 423,586 GWh of electricity exchange between member TSOs 
 1,023,721 MW net generation capacity connected to the grid

See also
EURELECTRIC
Agency for the Cooperation of Energy Regulators
European Energy Community
European Network of Transmission System Operators for Gas (ENTSOG)
IPS/UPS – TSO organization for the networks of most of the former Soviet republics and Mongolia
SuperSmart Grid, European super grid
 Nord Pool

References

External links
 ENTSO-E website
 ENTSO-E Transparency Platform
 EC Website on Electricity

Electric power in the European Union
 
International energy organizations
Organisations based in Brussels